The Liedas (or Leda) is a river of  Kėdainiai district municipality, Kaunas County, central Lithuania. It flows for 17.7 kilometres and has a basin area of 31.5 km².

It starts nearby Pelutava village and later flows through the Pernarava-Šaravai Forest. It meets the Šušvė from the right side nearby Juodkaimiai village.

The hydronym Liedas possibly derives from Lithuanian verbs liedyti, lieti ('to water').

References

Rivers of Lithuania
Kėdainiai District Municipality